Chico Hamilton Quintet in Hi Fi is an album by drummer and bandleader Chico Hamilton, released on the Pacific Jazz label. The bulk of album was recorded at two sessions in 1956; a live drum solo was recorded in 1954.

The cover artwork is a photo of artist Vito Paulekas.

Reception 

The AllMusic site rated the album 3 stars.

Track listing 
 "Jonalah" (Carson Smith) - 2:15
 "Chrissie" (Jim Hall) - 3:50
 "The Wind" (Russ Freeman) - 3:32
 "Gone Lover (When Your Lover Has Gone)" (Einar Aaron Swan) - 3:48
 "The Ghost" (Buddy Collette) - 5:05
 "Sleepy Slept Here (Santa Monica)" (Collette) - 4:08
 "Taking a Chance on Love" (Vernon Duke, John La Touche, Ted Fetter) - 4:07
 "The Squimp" (Fred Katz) - 1:47
 "Topsy" (Eddie Durham, Edgar Battle) - 4:43
 "Drums West" (Chico Hamilton) - 4:15
 "Sleep" (Adam Geibel, Earl Burtnett) - 2:26
Recorded at Stockton High School in Stockton, CA on November 12, 1954 (track 10), in Los Angeles, CA on January 4, 1956 (tracks 1-5) and at Music Box Theatre in Hollywood, CA on February 10 & 13, 1956 (tracks 6-9 & 11).

Personnel 
Chico Hamilton - drums
Buddy Collette - tenor saxophone, alto saxophone, flute, clarinet (tracks 1-9 & 11)
Fred Katz - cello (tracks 1-9 & 11)
Jim Hall - guitar (tracks 1-9 & 11)
Carson Smith - bass (tracks 1-9 & 11)

References 

Pacific Jazz Records albums
Chico Hamilton albums
1956 albums